A gopuram or gopura is a monumental tower, usually ornate, at the entrance of any temple, especially in Southern India. They are a prominent feature of koils, Hindu temples built in the Dravidian style. They are topped by the kalasam, a bulbous stone finial. They function as gateways through the walls that surround the temple complex.

The gopuram's origins can be traced back to early structures built under the Tamil kings of the Pallava and Chola dynasties. By the twelfth century, during the Pandya dynasty, these gateways became a dominant feature of a temple's outer appearance, eventually overshadowing the inner sanctuary which became obscured from view by the gopuram's colossal size. It also dominated the inner sanctum in amount of ornamentation. Often a shrine has more than one gopuram.

A koil may have multiple gopurams, typically constructed into multiple walls in tiers around the main shrine.

Tallest Gopurams
Gopurams are widespread in south Indian temples, predominantly in Tamil Nadu.  Very tall gopurams are a later feature, added from the Middle Ages onwards, typically to much older temples.

Tallest Vimana 
Vimanas are structures over the sanctum of temples. In Northern India they are called sikharas.  In the Nagara style of architecture, the vimana is the sanctum (garbhagruha) of the temple housing the main deities and they are the tallest part of the entire temple. In many cases within South India, the vimanams are confused with gopurams. In Tamil Nadu, vimanams are present above the garbhagruha or sanctum sanctorum of a Hindu temple and will be relatively smaller in size compared to the gopurams, which are usually present at the entrance of the temple. The fact of these vimana is that, usually these are always made by the shining material and also in practical life we believe that the good thing always rises up, so as per the santan dharma also, the positivity of God rises up to the shining vimana when sunlight falls on shining vimana it reflects all the postivity/blessing from the particular temple to the people.

Under construction

See also
 List of largest Hindu temples
 List of large temple tanks
 List of human stampedes in Hindu temples
 Lists of Hindu temples by country

Notes

References

.
.
 .
 .

 
Hinduism-related lists
Gopruams
Towers in India
Gopurams, Tallest